Obulapuram is a village in Ellantakunta Mandal in the Rajanna Sircilla district of Telangana state, India.

Demographics
Telugu is the local language. Total population is 2,085 living in 501 houses. Male population is 1,017 and female population is 1,068. Total area is 1572 hectares.

Villages in Rajanna Sircilla district